Order, ORDER or Orders may refer to:

 A socio-political and natural or existing system
 Categorization, the process in which ideas and objects are recognized, differentiated, and understood
 Heterarchy, a system of organization wherein the elements have the potential to be ranked a number of different ways
 Hierarchy, an arrangement of items that are represented as being "above", "below", or "at the same level as" one another
 an action or inaction that must be obeyed, mandated by someone in authority

People
 Orders (surname)

Arts, entertainment, and media
 Order (album), a 2009 album by Maroon
 "Order", a 2016 song from Brand New Maid by Band-Maid
 Orders (1974 film), a film by Michel Brault
 Orders, a 2010 film by Brian Christopher
 Orders, a 2017 film by Eric Marsh and Andrew Stasiulis
 Jed & Order, a 2022 film by Jedman

Business
 Blanket order, a purchase order to allow multiple delivery dates over a period of time
 Money order or postal order, a financial instrument usually intended for sending money through the mail
 Purchase order, a document issued by a buyer to a seller, indicating types, quantities, and agreed prices
 Sales order, an order issued by a business or trader to a customer

Exclusive organisations  
 Order (distinction), a visible honour in society 
 Dynastic order of a presently or formerly sovereign royal house
 Order of merit of a state or other entity
 Order of precedence, a sequential hierarchy of the nominal importance of items
 Fraternal order
 Military order (religious society), established in the era of the Crusades
 Order of chivalry, established since the Middle Ages

Legal and political terminology
 Court order, made by a judge, e.g., a restraining order
 Executive order (disambiguation)
 Law and order (politics), approach focusing on harsher enforcement and penalties as ways to reduce crime
 Public-order crime, type of crime that runs contrary to social order
 Organized crime, groupings of highly centralized criminal enterprises
 Social order, set or system of linked social structures, institutions, relations, customs, values and practices
 Statutory instrument, type of delegated legislation
Professional order, organization which comprises all the members of the same profession

Military
 Military order (disambiguation)
 Military order (instruction), binding instruction given by a senior rank to a junior rank in a military context 
 General order, a published directive from a commander
 Standing order (disambiguation)
 An order of chivalry, if membership is conferred on military personnel as a result of valorous, exemplary or distinguished service
 Tactical formation, an arrangement or deployment of moving military forces

Philosophy 
 Order (logic), a property used to characterize logical systems
 Natural order (philosophy), the moral source from which natural law seeks to derive its authority

Religion
 Ecclesiastical decoration, order or a decoration conferred by a head of a church
 Holy orders, the rite or sacrament in which clergy are ordained
 Monastic order, a religious way of life in which one renounces worldly pursuits to devote oneself fully to spiritual work
 Order of Mass, an outline of a Mass celebration
 Religious order, a community or organization set apart from the general society for devotion to a religious practice
 Religious order (Catholic), a religious order in the context of the Roman Catholic Church
 Canon regular, or canonical order, a class of religious orders for priests in the Catholic Church

Science and technology

Biology and healthcare
 Order (biology), a classification of organisms by rank
 Order, in phytosociology, an ecological grouping of plants, between alliance and class
 Ordo naturalis (natural order), an outdated rank in biology, equivalent to the modern rank of family
 Order, in medicine, refers to a formal request made by authorized health practitioners to carry out a specific clinical action concerning diagnosis or treatment

Computing
 Order of computation, the computational complexity in the analysis of algorithms
 Big O notation, notation describing limiting behavior
 Z-order, which graphics cover up others on computer screens

Mathematics
 Order (journal), an academic journal on order theory
 Order (mathematics)
 Order, an arrangement of items in sequence
 Order, the result of enumeration of a set of items
 Order, a mathematical structure modeling sequenced items, dealt with in order theory
 Order of hierarchical complexity, quantified by the model of hierarchical complexity, the ordinal complexity of tasks that are addressed
 Ordered set, an ordered structure, in mathematics
 Ordinate in mathematics, the y element of an ordered pair (x, y)
 Partially ordered set
 Complete partial order
 Permutation, the act of arranging all the members of a set into some sequence or order
 Ranking
 Stochastic ordering of random variables or probability distributions

Physics
 Implicate and explicate order, ontological concepts for quantum theory
 Order and disorder (physics), measured by an order parameter or more generally by entropy
 Order, optics, the category number of lighthouse Fresnel lenses, defining size and focal length
 Topological order in quantum mechanics, an organized quantum state

Signal processing
 First-order hold,  mathematical model of the practical reconstruction of sampled signals
 Modulation order, the number of different symbols that can be sent using a given modulation
 Polynomial order, of a filter transfer function

Other uses in science and technology
 ORDER (spacecraft), a space debris removal transport satellite
Order (mouldings), each of a series of recessed arches and supports around a doorway or similar feature
 Classical order, architectonic orders in architecture
 Collation, the ordering of information
 Alphabetical order, the ordering of letters
 Order of reaction, a concept of chemical kinetics
 Stream order, used to define river networks based on a hierarchy of tributaries

See also

 Chaos (disambiguation)
 Classification
 Coordination (disambiguation)
 Disorder (disambiguation)
 Ordinal (disambiguation)
 Organization (disambiguation)
 Structure (disambiguation)